Alexander Spanggaard Bond (born 18 June 1996) is a Danish badminton player. He was the boys' doubles gold medalist at the 2015 European Junior Championships partnered with Joel Eipe.

Achievements

European Junior Championships 
Boys' doubles

BWF International Challenge/Series 
Men's doubles

Mixed doubles

  BWF International Challenge tournament
  BWF International Series tournament
  BWF Future Series tournament

References

External links 
 

1996 births
Living people
Danish male badminton players